The Carolina Coyotes are a professional basketball team in  Columbia, South Carolina, and members of The Basketball League (TBL).

History
On October 23, 2020, The Basketball League (TBL) announced the Charleston Coyotes were approved as a expansion franchise for the upcoming 2021 season.

The team is owned by Perry Bradley Jr. Building Better Communities and Head Coach of the Carolina Coyotes.

On April 1, 2021 it was announced that the team moved to Columbia, South Carolina and renamed the Carolina Coyotes.

References

External links 

Sports in Columbia, South Carolina
Basketball teams in South Carolina
 Category:2020 establishments in South Carolina
The Basketball League teams
Basketball teams established in 2020